Diagnosis: Murder third season originally aired Fridays at 9:00-10:00 pm (EST). The season was released on DVD by Paramount Home Video.

Cast
Dick Van Dyke as Dr. Mark Sloan
Victoria Rowell as Dr. Amanda Bentley
Charlie Schlatter as Dr. Jesse Travis
Michael Tucci as Norman Briggs
Barry Van Dyke as Steve Sloan

Episodes

References

Diagnosis: Murder seasons
1995 American television seasons
1996 American television seasons